The Smile Sessions is a compilation album and box set recorded by American rock band the Beach Boys, released on October 31, 2011 by Capitol Records. The set is the follow-up to The Pet Sounds Sessions (1997), this time focusing on the abandoned recordings from the band's unfinished 1966–1967 album Smile. It features comprehensive session highlights and outtakes, with the first 19 tracks comprising a hypothetical version of the completed Smile album.

The compilation is the first and only package devoted to the 1960s Smile recordings originally produced by Brian Wilson, arriving after decades of public anticipation and numerous false starts. The project was led primarily by audio engineers Alan Boyd, Mark Linett, and Capitol A&R director Dennis Wolfe, with Wilson acting as a remote supervisor, assisting the engineers with some mixing decisions. Previously, Wilson had completed a solo album based on Smile in 2004, which Boyd, Linett, and Wolfe used as a blueprint for The Smile Sessions. Wilson later stated that, while the compilation is "not a far cry" from his original vision, he prefers his 2004 version.

The Smile Sessions received virtually unanimous critical acclaim upon release. It was ranked number 381 in Rolling Stones 2012 list of the greatest albums of all time and won the Grammy Award for Best Historical Album at the 2013 Grammy Awards. A spiritual successor, 1967 – Sunshine Tomorrow, followed in 2017.

Background
Plans for a Smile archival release go back to at least early 1980s, when it was proposed that the album be issued in some form. In his 1978 biography The Beach Boys and the California Myth, David Leaf wrote that Smile "can never be completed as Brian intended, so a compromise solution might be to release the surviving tapes and outtakes in a series of records called The Smile Sessions [like] Elvis' Sun Sessions ..." In 1993, the box set Good Vibrations: Thirty Years of The Beach Boys included the debut of several unreleased Smile recordings. In 1997, Capitol Records issued The Pet Sounds Sessions, which featured an assortment of alternate mixes and highlights of the Pet Sounds recording sessions spread over four CDs. The releases provoked speculation that an official Smile release was imminent.

In 2004, Wilson released a reimagined version of the album, Brian Wilson Presents Smile. A comprehensive and official package dedicated to the original Beach Boys' recordings had not been compiled partly due to the logistics in organizing the dozens of convoluted song components. Band producer/archivist Mark Linett stated, "All we had were a bunch of bits and pieces — a few songs that were more or less completed later.  And without some kind of a sequence from the artist, it would have just sort of been a jumble of sessions. And I think frankly until Brian felt comfortable with after all that time, he was able to finish what he started, there really wasn’t anything to seriously talk about."

In mid-2010, before the project was officially greenlit, Linett and the other compilers began assembling what would become The Smile Sessions. It was originally planned as a 3-CD set, but ultimately grew to 5 CDs, with two of those devoted solely to the sessions for "Heroes and Villains" and "Good Vibrations", respectively.

Smile reconstruction

The first nineteen tracks of The Smile Sessions constitute a hypothetical version of a completed Smile album that loosely follows the template established by Wilson's 2004 version. Wilson himself made a few suggestions to the compilation's sequencing after it was presented to him by the compilers Mark Linett, Alan Boyd and Dennis Wolfe. Linett said that the track listing would "present the whole piece as close to it as was envisioned, or as is envisioned, as possible ... with input from Brian as from everybody else".

According to Darian Sahanaja, "there was a discussion about whether to follow the 2004 sequence or completely present something new. In the end, of course, it all has to be approved by the Beach Boys themselves, and Brian lobbied hard for The Smile Sessions to follow the template of Brian Wilson Presents Smile." Asked if there had been anything newly unearthed from the sessions that would have influenced the 2004 assembly, Sahanaja responded, "No. Nothing major. Perhaps a few variations here and there, but nothing that would have altered the making of Brian Wilson Presents Smile."

The reconstruction runs at over 48 minutes, which would have been too much content to fit on a two-sided vinyl LP in 1967. Referencing this, Linett argued that The Smile Sessions may be more accurate to Wilson's vision than if he had completed the album in 1967, surmising that Wilson "would have been happier if he had had a bigger canvas to present [Smile]." Asked if Linett and Boyd had arrived at what he had envisioned during the 1960s, Wilson responded: "Somewhat, yeah. To some degree. It's not a far cry from what I thought it would be." He added that he preferred his 2004 version.

Technical details
The reconstruction is presented in monaural due to missing stems and as a nod to Wilson's producing methods at the time. Digital manipulation was used. For instance, on "Surf's Up", the instrumental track was mashed up and synced with the vocal stem from an alternate performance of the song.

Not all of the tracks feature material that was originally recorded for the Smile album. In reference to including sessions from Smiley Smile, Linett stated, "Of course there’s things that some people think – should Smiley Smile sessions be there – [with tracks such as] "Can't Wait Too Long", we get into a very fuzzy area." A list of notes on the reconstructed album assembly were given in the booklet:

Brian Wilson's lead vocals for "I'm in Great Shape" and "Barnyard" are taken from his and Van Dyke Parks' piano demo of "Heroes and Villains" (which includes the other two songs), recorded on November 4, 1966 for KHJ Radio and featured in full as track 36 on Disc Two in the 5-CD box set edition. The vocals were stripped from the demo and laid on the existing backing tracks, comprising instrumentation, backing vocals and animal noises by the band.
"The Elements: Fire" contains wordless vocals that were recorded for "Fall Breaks and Back to Winter" on June 29, 1967.
"Holidays" and "Wind Chimes" segue together with a pitch-shifted version of the Smiley Smile "Wind Chimes" coda, recorded July 11, 1967.
The "Cool Cool Water Chant" intro to "Love to Say Dada" and Carl Wilson's "da-da" vocals were recorded in October 1967.
Carl Wilson's lead vocal on "Cabin Essence" was recorded for the 20/20 album on November 20, 1968.
The "bygones", Carl Wilson's backing vocals and the "Child Is Father of the Man" coda of "Surf's Up" was recorded in summer 1971.

Release

On February 3, 2011, Al Jardine told an interviewer that "Capitol Records plans to issue a Beach Boys version of Smile sometime this summer to begin the celebration of the Beach Boys’ 50th anniversary. Smile is the Holy Grail for Beach Boys’ fans, so it will be good." Jardine also mentioned that the surviving Beach Boys "didn't do any new recording. I'm happy to see it finally come out. Brian’s changed his mind about releasing the material, but it was inevitable, wasn’t it?" The release was confirmed by Capitol Records on March 11, with the acknowledgement that an official release was planned for later in 2011.

After numerous delays, The Smile Sessions was released online via iTunes on October 31, 2011, and the next day on CD, vinyl and through other online services via digital download. The compilation was released in an array of physical format releases, including a single CD release, a double LP release, a deluxe 2-CD package, as well as a limited edition deluxe box set composed of 5 CDs, 2 LPs, 2 singles on 7" vinyl records, a poster and a 60-page booklet that features high quality photographs, essays and liner notes on the reconstruction process.

The crowdsourcing film studio Tongal was used to create the music videos for The Smile Sessions, where fans in 2011 could submit video concepts, which were voted on and ultimately selected by other fans for two videos.

Reception

The Smile Sessions was met with universal acclaim. It was named the best reissue of 2011 by Rolling Stone magazine, while The Wire magazine placed it fifth in its annual critics' poll of the top releases of the year. In 2012, it was ranked number 381 in Rolling Stones list of the greatest albums of all time. It won the Best Historical Album award at the 2013 Grammy Awards.

Pitchfork reviewer Mark Richardson gave the album a perfect score and wrote, "What's here is brilliant, beautiful, and, most importantly, finally able to stand tall on its own." The Los Angeles Times Randall Roberts encouraged its inclusion in "every library of American recording history," suggesting, "university composition departments, music professors, budding recording engineers and composers should study it." Rolling Stones David Fricke declared in his review, "there is delight and confidence in Wilson's exchanges with his studio crew. ... Wilson never found it, but the greatest pop album ever made is still in here, somewhere."

Writing in LA Weekly, musician Henry Rollins praised the compiled recordings as "even better than advertised ... Sonically, the album is one of the best things you are likely to hear in all of your life. There are moments on SMiLE that are so astonishingly good you might find yourself just staring at your speakers in unguarded wonder, as I have." PopMatters Thomas Britt wrote "There is something holy in the tapestry of the album" and when reflecting on the drama surrounding the album's history stated "Contemporary bands could certainly stand to realize that all the band myths and stories in the world don’t matter much if you can't bring the songs, and no one brought the songs like Brian Wilson."

Track listing

Smile (tracks 1–19 all editions)

Bonus tracks

Two-CD deluxe edition

Vinyl edition

Box set edition

Bonus 7" records

All tracks written by Brian Wilson and Van Dyke Parks.

Personnel
Adapted from band archivist Craig Slowinski.

Recording
These credits pertain only to the first 19 tracks.

The Beach Boys
Al Jardine – lead, harmony and backing vocals, vegetable chomping (on "Vega-Tables")
Bruce Johnston – harmony and backing vocals
Mike Love – lead, harmony and backing vocals, vegetable chomping (on "Vega-Tables")
Brian Wilson – lead, harmony and backing vocals; grand piano (on "Child Is Father of the Man", "Surf's Up", "Vega-Tables", and "Wind Chimes"), harpsichord (on "Do You Like Worms?" and "Wonderful"), tack piano (on "Heroes and Villains", "Child Is Father of the Man", "Wind Chimes", and "Good Vibrations"), Baldwin organ (on "Heroes and Villains"), electric harpsichord (on "Heroes and Villains" and "Vega-Tables"), Fender bass (on "I'm in Great Shape"), temple blocks (on "Love to Say Dada"), tambourine (on "Good Vibrations"), vegetable chomping (on "Vega-Tables")
Carl Wilson – lead, harmony and backing vocals; electric guitar (on "Child Is Father of the Man", "Wind Chimes" and "Good Vibrations"), Fender bass (on "Vega-Tables", "Holidays" and "Wind Chimes"), acoustic guitar (on "Cabin Essence"), castanet (on "Child Is Father of the Man"), shaker (on "Good Vibrations"), vegetable chomping (on "Vega-Tables")
Dennis Wilson – lead, harmony and backing vocals, drums (on "Vega-Tables" and "Holidays"), percussion (on "Vega-Tables"), Hammond organ (on "Good Vibrations"), xylophone (on "Vega-Tables"), vegetable chomping (on "Vega-Tables")

Guests
Gene Gaddy – "You're under arrest!"
Van Dyke Parks – piano with taped strings (on "I'm In Great Shape",  "Do You Like Worms?", and "Holidays"), upright piano (on "Cabin Essence"), tack piano (on "Heroes and Villains", "Barnyard", and "Do You Like Worms?"), marimba (on "Wind Chimes")

Session musicians

Charles C. Berghofer – upright bass
Hal Blaine – drums, percussion
 Jimmy Bond Jr. – upright bass
James Burton – dobro
Frank Capp – percussion, bongos, drums, glockenspiel, hi hat, stick, tambourine, temple blocks, vibraphone
Jerry Cole – guitar
Al De Lory – piano, tack piano
 Joseph DiFiore - viola  
Jesse Ehrlich – cello
Gene Estes – percussion, Hammond organ, marimba, percussion, piano, recorder, shaker, triangle, vibraphone, whistle
Carl Fortina – accordion
Sam Glenn – saxophone
Jim Gordon – drums, conga drums, tambourine
William Green – clarinet, flute, alto flute, piccolo, bass saxophone, tenor saxophone, whistle
Jim Horn – clarinet, flute, kazoo, piccolo, slide whistle, percussion 
Armand Kaproff – cello
Alfred Lustgarten – violin  
Arthur Maebe – French horn
Carol Kaye – bass guitar, banjo
Larry Knechtel – grand piano, organ
Jay Migliori – saxophone
Oliver Mitchell – trumpet
Tommy Morgan – harmonica, bass harmonica, jew's-harp
Bill Pitman – guitar
Ray Pohlman – bass guitar
Don Randi – piano, harpsichord
Dorothy Remsen – harp
Lyle Ritz – upright bass
Billy Strange – guitar
Paul Tanner – Electro-Theremin
Don Randi – celeste, electric harpsichord, grand piano, tack piano  
Tommy Tedesco – guitar, bouzouki
Alan Weight – trumpet

Production

Alan Boyd – compilation producer, editing, liner notes, producer
Chuck Britz – engineer
Stacey Freeman –  product manager
Frank Holmes – design, drawing
Mark Linett – compilation producer, editing, liner notes, mastering, mixing, producer
Mark London – hard-cover book design
Domenic Priore – project consultant
Tom Recchion – art direction, design
Peter Reum – photography
Diane Rovell – contractor
Mikel Samson – production design
Guy Webster – photography
Brian Wilson – arranger, compilation producer, composer, liner notes, main personnel, photography, producer
Dennis Wolfe – compilation producer, liner notes

Charts

Accolades

References 

Concept albums
The Beach Boys compilation albums
Psychedelic rock albums by American artists
Baroque pop albums
Capitol Records compilation albums
Albums produced by Brian Wilson
2011 compilation albums
Grammy Award for Best Historical Album
Albums recorded at Gold Star Studios
Albums recorded at United Western Recorders
Compilation albums published posthumously
Albums recorded at Sunset Sound Recorders